The Valley Greyhound Stadium is a greyhound racing stadium in Twyn Road, Ystrad Mynach, Hengoed, Wales.

Location
The track, known as 'The Valley', is on Twyn Road (CF82 7SP) sandwiched between the Caerphilly Road and A469 and the east bank of the Rhymney River (on the north side of the Dyffryn Business Park).

Licensing
It is the only remaining greyhound racing track in Wales and is independent (not affiliated to the Greyhound Board of Great Britain but, instead, licensed by the local authority). Colloquially known as 'flapping', independent greyhound racing features local greyhounds racing at local tracks. The Valley Greyhound Stadium is one of only two independent (unaffiliated to a governing body) greyhound tracks remaining in the United Kingdom, the other being Thornton in Scotland.

History
Planning for the stadium was given during April 1975. The stadium opened to greyhound racing on 20 July 1976, with the first ever winner being a greyhound called 'Boss' who won in a time of 19.20 seconds over 310 yards. The circuit is 410 yards in circumference consisting of race distances of 310, 515 and 720 yards. The track also stages occasional '100 yard dash' races. The principal events held at the track are the Welsh Greyhound Derby (the richest greyhound race in Wales) and the Glamorgan Cup. In 2011, the stadium underwent a significant renovation including an indoor lounge with seating, panoramic viewing, television race replay monitors and a fully licensed bar.

In February 2020, flooding caused a temporary closure after the Rhymney River burst its banks,. However, the greyhound owners and supporters put in hundreds of hours of voluntary work to help repair the racing surface and repaint the stadium, which reopened only three weeks later. In 2021, restrictions imposed by the Welsh Government to combat the coronavirus pandemic meant that the stadium had to shut for 161 days. When it reopened on 22 May 2021 the first post-lockdown meeting sold out.

In October 2019, Star Sports Bookmakers (sponsors of the English Greyhound Derby) announced an interest in acquiring the Valley Greyhound Stadium with a view to its operating as a Greyhound Board of Great Britain licensed track in 2021. However, the economic crisis caused by 2020's COVID pandemic led to the plans being shelved.

In December 2021, Dave Barclay (owner and promoter of Harlow Stadium), announced that he had completed a deal to buy the Valley Greyhound Stadium with a view to its operating as a Greyhound Board of Great Britain (GBGB) licensed track by 2023. In the meantime, the stadium continues to stage independent greyhound racing every week.

Present racing
Racing takes place on Saturday evenings with the first race at 7.00 pm (gates open 6.00 pm). Nowadays, greyhounds regularly break 17.00 seconds over 310 yards and 29.00 seconds over the standard distance of 515 yards. Major competitions are held regularly and licensed bookmakers attend every meeting. The venue is popular with families with free entry for children. Greyhound owners and trainers encourage children to interact with the greyhounds after they have raced.

Gallery

References

See also 
 Greyhound racing in the United Kingdom

Greyhound racing in Wales
Greyhound racing venues in the United Kingdom